The 2012 EuroHockey Club Champions Cup was the 40th edition of the premier European competition for women's field hockey clubs. The finals phase of the competition was held in Amsterdam from May 25–27.

Laren defeated defending champion Den Bosch in the final 1–0. This was their maiden title in the event, and also ended Den Bosch's record 12–year winning streak. Hamburg and Club de Campo also reached the final four, with Hamburg taking out the bronze medal with a 3–1 win.

Venues
The tournament was held across three cities, with the group stage and quarter-finals taking place in two separate locations, while the semi-finals and finals culminated at a singular venue.

Teams
The following twelve teams contested the 2012 EHCCC:

  Atasport
  Grodno
  Royal Wellington 
  Leicester
  Reading
  Hamburg
  Klipper
  Den Bosch
  Laren
  Izmaylovo
  Club de Campo 
  Real Sociedad

Champions Cup

Results

Preliminary round

Pool A

Pool B

Pool C

Pool D

Classification round

Quarter-finals

Semi-finals

Third and fourth place

Final

Lower categories

Champions Trophy (2nd division)

Challenge I (3rd division)

Challenge II (4th division)

References

2012
2012 in women's field hockey
2011–12 in European field hockey